In Winter is the seventh studio album by British singer-songwriter Katie Melua. It was released through BMG Rights Management on 14 October 2016.

Background
For this record, Melua went back to her native Georgia to record an album with the Gori Women's Choir, a native Georgian all-woman singing troupe. She teamed up with co-producer Adam 'Cecil' Bartlett, and travelled to the town of Gori, where they set up a recording studio in the local community arts centre. For the special choral arrangements, she brought in composer Bob Chilcott. This was Melua's first album since the end of her six album partnership deal with Mike Batt on his Dramatico Record label.

The album comprises a collection of seasonal covers from various cultures, and some original works reflecting on Melua's upbringing during Georgia's Soviet era and the difficult times of its subsequent civil war.

Track listing

Charts

Weekly charts

Year-end charts

Certifications

References

2016 Christmas albums
Katie Melua albums